The Hotel Union, formerly the Rhodema Hotel and the San Carlos Hotel, at 811 Geary Street in the Tenderloin neighborhood of San Francisco, is a building listed in the National Register of Historic Places.

The building is most notable for being the home of fantasy, science fiction, and horror author Fritz Leiber from 1969 to 1977, as well as of the protagonist of his 1977 novel Our Lady of Darkness.

References

Hotel buildings on the National Register of Historic Places in California
Hotels in San Francisco
1925 establishments in California
Hotel buildings completed in 1925
Tenderloin, San Francisco
National Register of Historic Places in San Francisco